Gördesli Makbule (1902–1922), also known as Makbule Efe, was a woman guerrilla from Turkey, one of the heroes of the National Liberation War. She fought as a member of Kuva-yı Milliye against the Greek invasion.

Early life 
Makbule was born in Gördes, Manisa. She had a large family who owned a farm and some land. She learned horse-riding and shooting at an early age like many other women in her town.

Military experience 
She participated in military resistance in 1922, and fought in and around Demirci, Gördes, Simav, Bigadiç ve Sındırgı.

She was shot aged 20.

Commemoration 
Her grave was discovered by Zekeriya Özdemir in Gördes in 2000. Commemoration events were organised in Gördes to mark the 100th year of her death.

References 

1902 births
1922 deaths
Turkish women
Members of Kuva-yi Milliye